Denise Dumont (born 20 March 1955 in Fortaleza, Ceará) is a Brazilian television and film actress.

Selected filmography
 Filhos e Amantes (1981)
 Rio Babilônia (1982)
 Kiss of the Spider Woman (1985)
 The Allnighter (1987)
 Radio Days (1987)
 The Long Haul (1988)
 Heart of Midnight (1988)

References

External links
 

1955 births
Living people
Brazilian film actresses
Brazilian television actresses